Hypolepis punctata, synonym Polypodium punctatum, is a species of fern in the family Polypodiaceae. It is native to China and East Asia.

References 

 Arctos Database entries

Dennstaedtiaceae
Plants described in 1784
Flora of China
Flora of Eastern Asia